Mohammad Taqi (also Romanized as Moḩammad Taqī) is a village in Pian Rural District, in the Central District of Izeh County, Khuzestan Province, Iran. At the 2006 census, its population was 60, in 10 families.

References 

Populated places in Izeh County